The 1982–83 North West Counties Football League was the first in the history of the North West Counties Football League, a football competition in England. Teams were divided into three divisions.

Division One

The division featured 20 new teams:
 Accrington Stanley, from Cheshire County League Division One
 Ashton United, from Cheshire County League Division One
 Bootle, from Cheshire County League Division One
 Burscough, from Cheshire County League Division One
 Congleton Town, from Cheshire County League Division Two
 Curzon Ashton, from Cheshire County League Division One
 Darwen, from Cheshire County League Division One
 Formby, from Cheshire County League Division One
 Glossop, from Cheshire County League Division One
 Horwich RMI, from Cheshire County League Division One
 Lancaster City, from Northern Premier League
 Leek Town, from Cheshire County League Division One
 Leyland Motors, from Cheshire County League Division Two
 Nantwich Town, from Cheshire County League Division One
 Penrith, from Northern League
 Prescot Cables, from Cheshire County League Division One
 Rhyl, from Cheshire County League Division Two
 St. Helens Town, from Cheshire County League Division One
 Stalybridge Celtic, from Cheshire County League Division One
 Winsford United, from Cheshire County League Division One

League table

Division Two

The division featured 20 new teams:
 Atherton Laburnum Rovers, from Cheshire County League Division Two
 Caernarfon Town, from Lancashire Combination
 Chadderton, from Lancashire Combination
 Droylsden, from Cheshire County League Division One
 Eastwood Hanley, from Cheshire County League Division Two
 Ellesmere Port & Neston, from Cheshire County League Division Two
 Fleetwood Town, from Cheshire County League Division One
 Ford Motors, from Cheshire County League Division Two
 Great Harwood Town, from Lancashire Combination
 Irlam Town, from Cheshire County League Division Two
 Kirkby Town, from Cheshire County League Division Two
 Lytham, from Lancashire Combination
 New Mills, from Cheshire County League Division Two
 Padiham, from Lancashire Combination
 Prescot BI, from Cheshire County League Division Two
 Radcliffe Borough, from Cheshire County League Division Two
 Rossendale United, from Cheshire County League Division One
 Salford, from Cheshire County League Division Two
 Skelmersdale United, from Cheshire County League Division Two
 Wren Rovers, from Lancashire Combination

League table

Division Three

The division featured 18 new teams:
 Ashton Athletic, from Lancashire Combination
 Ashton Town, from Cheshire County League Division Two
 Atherton Collieries, from Cheshire County League Division Two
 Bacup Borough, from Lancashire Combination
 Blackpool Mechanics, from Lancashire Combination
 Bolton ST, from Lancashire Combination
 Clitheroe, from Lancashire Combination
 Colne Dynamoes, from Lancashire Combination
 Daisy Hill, from Lancashire Combination
 Maghull, from Cheshire County League Division Two
 Nelson, from Lancashire Combination
 Newton, from Mid-Cheshire League
 Oldham Dew, from Lancashire Combination
 Prestwich Heys, from Cheshire County League Division Two
 Vulcan Newton, from Lancashire Combination
 Warrington Town, from Cheshire County League Division Two
 Whitworth Valley, from Lancashire Combination
 Wigan Rovers, from Lancashire Combination

League table

Promotion and relegation

Division One
In the first season of the North West Counties Football League Division One second placed Rhyl and third placed Horwich RMI moved to the Northern Premier League while Nantwich Town were relegated to Division Two and Netherfield joined Division One from the Northern Premier League.

Division Two
Division Two champions Radcliffe Borough and second placed Caernarfon Town were promoted to Division One while Kirkby Town and already relegated New Mills left the League at the end of the season. Padiham were relegated to Division Three.

Division Three
Division Three champions Colne Dynamoes and second placed Warrington Town were promoted to Division Two while Wigan Rovers left the League at the end of the season and were replaced by newly admitted Cheadle Town and Urmston Town.

External links 
 North West Counties Football League Tables at RSSSF

North West Counties Football League seasons
7